Akeel Inham (born 28 March 1996) is a Sri Lankan cricketer. He made his List A debut for Anuradhaura District in the 2016–17 Districts One Day Tournament on 15 March 2017.

References

External links
 

1996 births
Living people
Sri Lankan cricketers
Anuradhaura District cricketers
Kalutara Town Club cricketers
Negombo Cricket Club cricketers
Cricketers from Colombo